Geoffrey G. Diehl (born April 23, 1969) is an American politician from the Commonwealth of Massachusetts. A Republican, he represented the 7th Plymouth district in the Massachusetts House of Representatives from 2011 to 2019.

Diehl was an unsuccessful Republican candidate for the U.S. Senate in 2018 and for governor of Massachusetts in 2022, losing both elections in landslides to Democrats Elizabeth Warren and Maura Healey respectively.

Early life and education
Geoff Diehl was born in Austin, Texas. At the age of 3, his family moved to Bethlehem, Pennsylvania. He attended Lake Forest Academy and graduated from Lehigh University in 1992 with a Bachelor of Arts degree in government and urban studies.

Career 
After graduating, Diehl moved to New York City and worked in advertising. He later worked in television production in Los Angeles, California. In 2001, he moved to his wife's hometown of Whitman, Massachusetts, where he worked as a business development executive in the sign industry. He also supported his wife in successfully starting and running a performing arts school, Boss Academy.

Massachusetts House of Representatives

2010 election
Diehl began his campaign to represent the 7th Plymouth District on February 22, 2010. Diehl received support from previous representatives from the same district, including Andrew Card, Michael Sullivan, Ned Kirby, and Ronald Whitney. Diehl also received the endorsement of U.S. Senator Scott Brown.

On November 2, 2010, he upset incumbent Allen McCarthy and was sworn in on January 5, 2011.

He was a member of the Joint Committee on Housing, House Committee on Global Warming and Climate Change, and the House Committee on Technology and Intergovernmental Affairs.

Tank the Gas Tax Movement
Geoff Diehl was a lead supporter of the successful ballot question campaign to repeal the Massachusetts gas tax indexing law in 2014.

2018 U.S. Senate election

In April 2017, Diehl announced his intent to challenge Elizabeth Warren for her U.S. Senate seat. In the Republican primary election held on September 4, 2018, Diehl finished first in a field of three candidates. The incumbent, Elizabeth Warren, defeated Diehl by 24 percentage points.

2022 gubernatorial campaign

On July 4, 2021, Geoff Diehl announced he was running for governor of Massachusetts. In October 2021, Donald Trump endorsed Geoff Diehl for Governor.
He was  Massachusetts state co-chair of Trump's 2016 presidential campaign and a Trump delegate to the 2016 Republican National Convention. Diehl also supported Jim Lyons, the chairman of the Massachusetts Republican Party, who in January 2021 was reelected to the party chairmanship after defeating a challenge from Shawn Dooley.

As a candidate, Diehl criticized federal and state mandates put in place during the COVID-19 pandemic and continuously supported workers and first responders being fired for not taking the vaccine. He is a proponent of parents who want to decide for their children whether or not they would like a vaccine.

At the state party convention on May 21, Diehl was officially endorsed by the Massachusetts Republican Party with 71% of the delegates' votes. He won the Republican nomination on September 6. On November 8, Attorney General of Massachusetts and Democratic nominee Maura Healey handily defeated Diehl in the general election.

Electoral history

Personal life
Before he entered politics, Diehl was a member of the Whitman Finance Committee. He remains a member of the MetroSouth Chamber of Commerce and South Shore Chamber of Commerce. Diehl is also an Eagle Scout. Diehl and his wife, KathyJo, have two daughters. They live in Whitman, Massachusetts.

References

External links

|-

|-

21st-century American politicians
Candidates in the 2018 United States Senate elections
Lake Forest Academy alumni
Lehigh University alumni
Living people
Republican Party members of the Massachusetts House of Representatives
Politicians from Bethlehem, Pennsylvania
People from Whitman, Massachusetts
1969 births